State Highway 37 (SH 37) is a New Zealand state highway in the Waikato/Waitomo region of the North Island. It was gazetted as a new state highway designation in 1997.

For many years the old T-intersection with SH 3 was a high crash area with many fatalities including foreign tourists. In 2015 NZTA completed a new roundabout to improve safety on the route.

See also
 List of New Zealand state highways

References

External links
 New Zealand Transport Agency

37
Transport in Waikato